Dedebağı (former Derasül) is a town in Acıpayam district of Denizli Province, Turkey. The population of Dedebağı was 2145 as of 2012. The original name of the settlement Derasül refers to a certain Derasül Bey who migrated from Greater Khorasan to Dedebağ about eight centuries ago. In 1968, it was declared the seat of its township.

References

Villages in Acıpayam District